The Battle of Picacho Pass, also known as the Battle of Picacho Peak, was an engagement of the American Civil War on April 15, 1862. It was fought between a Union cavalry patrol from California and a party of Confederate pickets from Tucson, and marks the westernmost battle of the American Civil War involving fatalities (though a skirmish known as the Battle of Stanwix Station was 40 miles further west and 80 miles from the California border in the direction of Fort Yuma).

Background
After a Confederate force of about 120 cavalrymen arrived at Tucson from Texas on February 28, 1862, they proclaimed Tucson the capital of the western district of the Confederate Arizona Territory, which comprised what is now southern Arizona and southern New Mexico. Mesilla, near Las Cruces, was declared the territorial capital and seat of the eastern district of the territory. The property of Tucson Unionists was confiscated and they were jailed or driven out of town. Confederates hoped a flood of sympathizers in southern California would join them and give the Confederacy an outlet on the Pacific Ocean, but this never happened. California Unionists were eager to prevent this, and 2,000 Union volunteers from California, known as the California Column and led by Colonel James Henry Carleton, moved east to Fort Yuma, California, and by May 1862 had driven the small Confederate force back into Texas.

Like most of the Civil War era engagements in Arizona (Dragoon Springs, Stanwix Station and Apache Pass) Picacho Pass occurred near remount stations along the former Butterfield Overland Stagecoach route, which opened in 1859 and ceased operations when the war began. This skirmish occurred about a mile northwest of Picacho Pass Station.

Battle
Twelve Union cavalry troopers and one scout (reported to be mountain man Pauline Weaver but in reality Tucson resident John W. Jones), commanded by Lieutenant James Barrett of the 1st California Cavalry, were conducting a sweep of the Picacho Peak area, looking for Confederates reported to be nearby. The Arizona Confederates were commanded by Sergeant Henry Holmes. Barrett was under orders not to engage them, but to wait for the main column to come up. However, "Lt. Barrett acting alone rather than in concert, surprised the Rebels and should have captured them without firing a shot, if the thing had been conducted properly." Instead, in mid afternoon the lieutenant "led his men into the thicket single file without dismounting them. The first fire from the enemy emptied four saddles, when the enemy retired farther into the dense thicket and had time to reload. ... Barrett followed them, calling on his men to follow him." Three of the Confederates surrendered. Barrett secured one of the prisoners and had just remounted his horse when a bullet struck him in the neck, killing him. Fierce and confused fighting continued among the mesquite and arroyos for 90 minutes, with two more Union fatalities and three troopers wounded. Exhausted and leaderless, the Californians broke off the fight and the  Arizona Rangers, minus three who surrendered, mounted and carried warning of the approaching Union army to Tucson. Barrett's disobedience of orders had cost him his life and lost any chance of a Union surprise attack on Tucson.

The Union troops retreated to the Pima Indian Villages and hastily built Fort Barrett (named for the fallen officer) at White's Mill, waiting to gather resources to continue the advance. However, with no Confederate reinforcements available, Captain Sherod Hunter and his men withdrew as soon as the column again advanced. The Union troops entered Tucson without any opposition.

The bodies of the two Union enlisted men killed at Picacho (George Johnson and William S Leonard) were later removed to the National Cemetery at the Presidio of San Francisco in San Francisco, California. However, Lieutenant Barrett's grave, near the present railroad tracks, remains undisturbed and unmarked. Union reports claimed that two Confederates were wounded in the fight, but Captain Hunter in his official report mentioned no Confederate casualties other than the three men captured.

Aftermath
Before this engagement a Confederate cavalry patrol had advanced as far west as Stanwix Station, where it was burning the hay stored there when it was attacked by a patrol of the California Column. The Confederates had been burning hay stored at the stage stations in order to delay the Union advance from California. About the same time as the skirmish at Picacho Peak, a larger force of Confederates was thwarted in its attempt to advance northward from Santa Fe, New Mexico, in the Battle of Glorieta Pass. By July the Confederates had retreated to Texas, though pro-Confederate militia units operated in some areas until mid-1863. The following year, the Union organized its own territory of Arizona, dividing New Mexico along the state's current north–south border, extending control southward from the provisional capital of Prescott. Although the encounter at Picacho Pass was only a minor event in the Civil War, it can be considered the high-water mark of the Confederate West.

Re-enactment
Every March, Picacho Peak State Park hosts a re-enactment of the Civil War battles of Arizona and New Mexico, including the battle of Picacho Pass. The re-enactments now have grown so large that many more participants tend to be involved than took part in the actual engagements, and include infantry units and artillery as well as cavalry. The 2015 re-enactment, which was held March 22 and 23, also included re-enactments of the Battle of Valverde and the Battle of Glorieta Pass, both of which took place in relatively nearby New Mexico.  The skirmish site and the remains of the Butterfield station are listed on the National Register of Historic Places. Re-Enactment discontinued until further notice.

Gallery

Further reading
 "The Battle of Picacho Pass: Visiting the Battlefield and Historic Site". The War Times Journal. Retrieved October 19, 2010.
 Masich, Andrew E., The Civil War in Arizona; the Story of the California Volunteers, 1861–65; University of Oklahoma Press (Norman, 2006).

See also

 Apache Wars
 New Mexico Campaign
 St. Albans Raid

References

1862 in the American Civil War
Picacho Pass
Picacho Pass
Picacho Pass
Butterfield Overland Mail
Picacho
History of Pinal County, Arizona
National Register of Historic Places in Pinal County, Arizona
April 1862 events